J. H. Duncan may refer to:

James H. Duncan (1793–1869), American politician
James Duncan (athlete) (1887–1955), American athlete
John H. Duncan (1855–1929), American architect